Count Teofilo "Theo" Guiscardo Rossi di Montelera, Prince of Premuda (May 17, 1902 – November 3, 1991) was an Italian bobsledder who competed in the early 1930s. He was the heir of the Rossi family, a dynasty of very wealthy distillers, dubbed kings of Vermouth" partners in the Martini e Rossi firm.
Martini e Rossi maintained a tradition of sponsoring offshore powerboating teams and events long after Rossi's death

Count Rossi was a world champion power boat racer. He won the 1934 World Championship for 12-Litre boats in a series of events in Europe and America. In 1937 Rossi again won the world championship, which included a victory in the President's Cup Regatta in Washington, D.C. In 1938 he won the American Power Boat Association's Gold Cup in Detroit, Michigan with his boat Alagi.He is one of the very few powerboat racers to ever defeat arch US powerboating champion racer Gar Wood. He was a multiple winner of the arduous powerboating endurance race down the Po river River, the Pavia-Venezia. He was set to defend the Gold Cup in 1939 when war broke out in Italy and he was forced to stay home and deal with the Nazi threat.

He was born in Turin. At the 1932 Winter Olympics in Lake Placid, New York, he finished fifth in the four-man event and sixth in the two-man event. Two 1975 Porsche 917 models were made in his honor.

References

 1932 bobsleigh two-man results
 1932 bobsleigh four-man results
 1975 silver Porsche 917 named for the count.
 Dark blue Porsche 917 named for the count.

1902 births
1991 deaths
Sportspeople from Turin
Bobsledders at the 1932 Winter Olympics
Italian male bobsledders
Italian royalty
Olympic bobsledders of Italy
Italian motorboat racers